Lachnoptera anticlia, the western blotched leopard, is a butterfly in the family Nymphalidae. It is found in Senegal, Guinea, Sierra Leone, Liberia, Ivory Coast, Ghana, Togo, Nigeria, Cameroon, Equatorial Guinea, Gabon, the Republic of the Congo, the Central African Republic, Angola, the Democratic Republic of the Congo, southern Sudan, Uganda, western Kenya, north-western Tanzania and north-western Zambia. The habitat consists of forests and forest margins.

Adults fly in the forest under storey as well as on top of the canopy. Both sexes are attracted to flowers and males mud-puddle and are attracted to urine patches.

The larvae feed on Rawsonia lucida and Scotellia chevalieri.

References

Vagrantini
Butterflies described in 1819
Butterflies of Africa
Taxa named by Jacob Hübner